is a city in Ibaraki Prefecture, Japan. , the city had an estimated population of 41,750 in 17,034 households and a population density of 220 persons per km². The percentage of the population aged over 65 was 34.6%.

Geography
Kitaibaraki is in northern Ibaraki Prefecture, bounded by Fukushima Prefecture to the north and the Pacific Ocean to the east. As its name implies, it is the northernmost city within Ibaraki. Approximately 80% of the total area is mountainous forest. The eastern region is low ground facing the ocean with spacious open flatland along the Okita and Satone Rivers.  It is approximately 57 kilometers to the northeast of Mito, the prefectural capital.

Surrounding municipalities
Ibaraki Prefecture
 Takahagi
Fukushima Prefecture
 Iwaki
Samegawa
Hanawa

Climate
Kitaibaraki has a Humid continental climate (Köppen Cfa) characterized by warm summers and cold winters with heavy snowfall.  The average annual temperature in Kitaibaraki is 13.0 °C. The average annual rainfall is 1435 mm with September as the wettest month. The temperatures are highest on average in August, at around 24.2 °C, and lowest in January, at around 2.9 °C.

Demographics
Per Japanese census data, the population of Kitaibaraki has fluctuated somewhat over the past 70 years.

History
Under the ritsuryō system, the area of Kitaibaraki was the northern tip of the Tōkaidō region, and was part of Hitachi Province. The towns of Otsu and Hirakata and the village of Kitanakago were created with the establishment of the modern municipalities system on April 1, 1889. The area was part of the Jōban coal fields and coal mines were developed in the early twentieth century. Kitanakago became the town of Isohara on January 1, 1925. On March 31, 1956 the towns of Otsu, Hirakata, Isohara and the villages of Sekinan, Sekimonto and Minaminakago merged to form the city of Kitaibaraki. The city suffered from serious damage caused by the tsunami from the 2011 Tōhoku earthquake.

Government
Kitaibaraki has a mayor-council form of government with a directly elected mayor and a unicameral city council of 19 members. Kitaibaraki, together with neighboring Takahagi, contributes two members to the Ibaraki Prefectural Assembly. In terms of national politics, the city is part of Ibaraki 5th district of the lower house of the Diet of Japan.

Economy
Commerce developed during the Edo period along the Tanagura highway, which was also called the 'Road of Salt'. The area flourished with ports for water transportation and coal mining began at the end of the Edo period. Kitaibaraki is now a regional commercial center with some light manufacturing. JX Nippon Mining & Metals Corporation, Nichia Steel Works, NOK Corporation and Fuso Pharmaceutical Industries have major factories in the city. The Jōban Coal Field, which was the mainstay of the economy from the Meiji period to the mid-Shōwa period, closed in 1976. Commercial fishing from Otsu fishing port, notably for angler fish, is also a factor in the local economy.

Education
Kitaibaraki has 12 public elementary schools and five public middle schools operated by the city government, and one public high school operated by the Ibaraki Prefectural Board of Education.

Transportation

Railway
 JR East – Jōban Line
  -  - .

Highway
  – Kitaibaraki Interchange, Nakago Service Area, Sekimoto Parking Area

Sister city relations
 – Wairoa District, New Zealand

Local attractions
 The scenic Izura coastline is near Otsu fishing port. This area was famous for Rokkaku-do, a six sided red house built by Tenshin Okakura. The Tenshin Memorial Museum, with regularly updated exhibits, offers visitors a glance at various schools of Japanese art. The sound of the waves of the Izura coast are listed as one of the 100 Soundscapes of Japan by the Japanese Ministry of the Environment
 Ujō Noguchi Memorial Museum

Festivals
The Sasara of Hanazono Shrine is a Shishi Mai (ritual dance with a lion's mask) with a 900 year-tradition. This dance can be seen yearly on May 5 at the Hanazono Shrine.
The Ofuna-Matsuri, the seafarer's festival, is held only once every five years. The first weekend in May, the festival is a prayer for large fish catches and protection from the clutches of the sea. A decorated ship is pulled by the seamen through the town toward a Shinto shrine. It was last held in 2014.
August 16 is the last day of Obon (festival of the dead). On this day around 6 AM, families celebrating Obon gather at Otsu Port for Bonbune Nagashi. Miniature fishing boats laden with vegetables are paraded in the port, and afterwards lanterns are let out to see in order to guide home the spirits of the dead.
The Kitaibaraki Citizen's Festival is held yearly on the last Saturday of August. There is a dance contest and fireworks.
The 'Ujo no Sato Minato Matsuri' (port festival) is held in the beginning of November at Otsu Port. There are various cultural exhibits along with food and game stalls. There is also a demonstration of how to carve an angler fish.

Notable people from Kitaibaraki 
Ujō Noguchi, poet, songwriter
Atsuko Kurusu, actress
Takehito Kanazawa, professional baseball player

References

External links

Official Website 

Cities in Ibaraki Prefecture
Kitaibaraki, Ibaraki
Populated coastal places in Japan